Betanzos may refer to:
Betanzos, a municipality in the province of A Coruña, Galicia, Spain
Betanzos (comarca), a comarca in the Province of A Coruña, Galicia, Spain
Betanzos (Bolivia), a municipality in Potosí Department, Bolivia
Betanzos CF, a football team based in Betanzos in the Province of A Coruña, Galicia, Spain
Betanzos (Vino de la Tierra), a Spanish geographical indication for Vino de la Tierra wines located in the autonomous community of Galicia

People
Betanzos (surname)